Aisin-Gioro Huisheng (26 February 1938 – 4 December 1957), better known simply as Huisheng or Eisei, was a Manchu-Japanese noblewoman. She was born in the Aisin Gioro clan, the imperial clan of the Qing dynasty. She was the elder daughter of Pujie, the younger brother of Puyi, the last emperor of China. Her mother was Hiro Saga, a Japanese noblewoman who married Pujie in 1937.

Life
Huisheng was born on 26 February 1938 at Xinjing Special Municipal First Hospital in Hsinking (present-day Changchun, Jilin, China), the capital of Manchukuo to Pujie and Hiro Saga. Her uncle, Puyi, ruled as the puppet emperor of Manchukuo under Japanese control during the Second Sino-Japanese War (1937–1945). Her younger sister was Husheng (嫮生; b. 1940). She lived in Manchukuo until 1943, when she was sent to Japan to live with her maternal grandparents. She was educated in various prestigious private schools, including the Gakushūin. She was very interested in Japanese and Chinese literature.

After the end of the war, Huisheng's father was captured by Soviet forces and held in a prison camp for five years before he was extradited to the People's Republic of China in 1950. He was then incarcerated in the Fushun War Criminals Management Centre. Huisheng's mother and younger sister were also captured and imprisoned in Shanghai before they were repatriated to Japan in 1947. However, even though Huisheng had been reunited with her mother and sister, her father was still imprisoned and out of contact with them. During this time, Huisheng wrote in Chinese to Chinese premier Zhou Enlai, requesting that he put her in touch with her father. Zhou was moved by her letter and granted her permission.

In April 1956, Huisheng was enrolled at the Gakushuin University, in June, she got into a relationship with her classmate , the son of a railway executive. Later in February 1957, Huisheng's mother strongly opposed to her daughter's decision to marry Ōkubo; either due to Ōkubo being a commoner, or because Huisheng had been considered as a potential candidate to marry the then-Crown Prince Akihito.

Death
Huisheng (age 19) and Ōkubo (age 20) disappeared on 4 December 1957 and were later found dead on Mount Amagi in the Izu Peninsula. Huisheng, wearing a golden ring on her finger, lay with her head cradled in Ōkubo's left arm. Ōkubo held a pistol in his right hand.

At the request of Ōkubo's father, Huisheng and Ōkubo's ashes were interred together first at the Saga family plot in Nison-in, and then at the Aisin-Gioro family plot in Shimonoseki, Yamaguchi.

Ancestry

References

1938 births
1957 suicides
Manchu people
Manchukuo royalty
People from Changchun
Chinese expatriates in Japan
Chinese people of Japanese descent
Gakushuin University alumni
Qing dynasty princesses
College students who committed suicide
Suicides by firearm in Japan
Joint suicides